Homoeriodictyol is a bitter-masking flavanone extracted from Yerba Santa (Eriodictyon californicum) a plant growing in America.

Homoeriodictyol (3`-methoxy-4`,5,7-trihydroxyflavanone) is one of the 4 flavanones identified by Symrise in this plant eliciting taste-modifying property: homoeriodictyol sodium salt, eriodictyol and sterubin.  Homoeriodictyol Sodium salt elicited the most potent bitter-masking activity by reducing from 10 to 40% the bitterness of salicin, amarogentin, paracetamol and quinine. However no bitter-masking activity was detected with bitter linoleic acid emulsions. According to Symrise's scientists homoeriodictyol sodium salt seems to be a taste-modifier with large potential in food applications and pharmaceuticals.

Structural relatives investigation based on eriodictyol and homoeriodictyol, found 2,4-Dihydroxybenzoic acid vanillylamide to elicits bitter-masking activity. At 0.1g/L, this vanillin derivative, was able to reduce the bitterness of a 0.5g/L caffeine solution by about 30%.

References 

O-methylated flavanones
Bitter-masking compounds
Taste modifiers
Physiology
Resorcinols